Ofo may refer to:

 Oslo Philharmonic, philharmonic orchestra based in Oslo, Norway
 Ufa (Öfö), capital of the Republic of Bashkortostan, Russia
 ofo (company), bike sharing company
 Mosopelea, Native American tribe
 Ofo language, indigenous language of the Mosopelea
 Ofo Uhiara (born 1975), British actor
 Office of Field Operations of the U.S. Customs and Border Protection agency
 Orbiting Frog Otolith, American satellite
 Ozark Festival Orchestra, Monett, Missouri, United States
 Ofo in Igboland, type of staff